Splurge is a Japanese-language pop album by Puffy Amiyumi that was released on June 28, 2006 in Japan. It was released in the US on July 25, 2006, after their East Coast Tour.

On tracks 12 and 13, "Camel Country" and "Security Blanket", the vocal parts are sung by Yumi Yoshimura and Ami Onuki solo, respectively.
A promo EP was released in Japan on July 25, 2006.

Track listing

Japan release
Track naming from Japanese edition of album, with translated English in brackets.
"Radio Tokyo" (Butch Walker)
"ナイスバディ (Nice Buddy)" (lyrics: Puffy / music: Andy Sturmer and Andy Thompson) 
"Tokyo I'm on My Way" (Andy Sturmer)
"Shall We Dance?" (Butch Walker)
"恋のエチュード (Love's Etude)" (Masamune Kusano)
"女マシンガン (Girl Machine Gun)" (lyrics: Seiji / music: Jon Spencer)
"Sunday in the Park" (Charley Drayton, Tamio Okuda)
"モグラライク (Mole-Like)" (Tamio Okuda)
"Missing You Baby" (lyrics: Puffy / music: Andy Sturmer)
"早春物語 (Early Spring Story)" (lyrics: Puffy / music: Anders Hellgren & David Myhr)
"モグラ (Mole)" (Kohmoto Hiroto)
"らくだの国 (Camel Country/Camel Land)" (Kazuyoshi Saito)
"Security Blanket" (lyrics: Ami Onuki / music: Ken Yokoyama)
"はじまりのうた (Song of Origin/Beginnings)" (lyrics: Puffy / music: Andy Sturmer & Bleu)
"Basket Case" (lyrics: Billie Joe Armstrong / music: Green Day)

US release
"Call Me What You Like (If You Like Rock-n-Roll)"
"Nice Buddy"
"Tokyo I'm on My Way"
"Radio Tokyo"
"Mole-Like"
"Etude"
"Go Baby Power Now"
"Sunday in the Park"
"Missing You Baby"
"The Story"
"Mole"
"Cameland"
"Security Blanket"
"Beginnings"
Bonus tracks:
"Friends Forever ~FICKLE Remix~"
"Teen Titans Theme ~POLYSICS' CR-06 MIX~"

Splurge EP
Call Me What You Like
Security Blanket
Tokyo I'm On My Way
Go Baby Power Now
Basket Case

Chart performance
In Japan it peaked at # 19 and stayed in the chart for 5 weeks, in the world chart peaked at number 9 and stayed in the chart for 2 weeks.

References

Puffy AmiYumi albums
Ki/oon Records albums
Tofu Records albums
2006 albums